This article lists various water polo records and statistics in relation to the Hungary men's national water polo team at the Summer Olympics.

The Hungary men's national water polo team has participated in 23 of 27 official men's water polo tournaments.

Abbreviations

Team statistics

Comprehensive results by tournament
Notes:
 Results of Olympic qualification tournaments are not included. Numbers refer to the final placing of each team at the respective Games.
 At the 1904 Summer Olympics, a water polo tournament was contested, but only American contestants participated. Currently the International Olympic Committee (IOC) and the International Swimming Federation (FINA) consider water polo event as part of unofficial program in 1904.
 Last updated: 5 May 2021.

Legend

  – Champions
  – Runners-up
  – Third place
  – Fourth place
  – The nation did not participate in the Games
  – Qualified for forthcoming tournament

Number of appearances
Last updated: 27 July 2021.

Best finishes
Last updated: 27 July 2021.

Finishes in the top four
Last updated: 5 May 2021.

Medal table
Last updated: 5 May 2021.

Player statistics

Multiple appearances

The following table is pre-sorted by number of Olympic appearances (in descending order), year of the last Olympic appearance (in ascending order), year of the first Olympic appearance (in ascending order), date of birth (in ascending order), name of the player (in ascending order), respectively.

Multiple medalists

The following table is pre-sorted by total number of Olympic medals (in descending order), number of Olympic gold medals (in descending order), number of Olympic silver medals (in descending order), year of receiving the last Olympic medal (in ascending order), year of receiving the first Olympic medal (in ascending order), name of the player (in ascending order), respectively.

Top goalscorers

The following table is pre-sorted by number of total goals (in descending order), year of the last Olympic appearance (in ascending order), year of the first Olympic appearance (in ascending order), name of the player (in ascending order), respectively.

Goalkeepers

The following table is pre-sorted by edition of the Olympics (in ascending order), cap number or name of the goalkeeper (in ascending order), respectively.

Last updated: 27 July 2021.

Abbreviation
 Eff % – Save efficiency (Saves / Shots)

Sources:
 Official Reports (PDF): 1996 (pp. 57–61, 69, 71, 73);
 Official Results Books (PDF): 2000 (pp. 45, 50, 55, 78, 81, 84, 87, 90), 2004 (pp. 207–208), 2008 (pp. 202–203), 2012 (pp. 481–482), 2016 (pp. 120–121).

Top sprinters
The following table is pre-sorted by number of total sprints won (in descending order), year of the last Olympic appearance (in ascending order), year of the first Olympic appearance (in ascending order), name of the sprinter (in ascending order), respectively.

* Number of sprinters (30+ sprints won, since 2000): 1
 Number of sprinters (20–29 sprints won, since 2000): 0
 Number of sprinters (10–19 sprints won, since 2000): 1
 Number of sprinters (5–9 sprints won, since 2000): 4
 Last updated: 15 May 2021.

Abbreviation
 Eff % – Efficiency (Sprints won / Sprints contested)

Source:
 Official Results Books (PDF): 2000 (pp. 45, 50, 55, 78, 81, 84, 87, 90), 2004 (pp. 207–208), 2008 (pp. 202–203), 2012 (pp. 481–482), 2016 (pp. 120–121).

Coach statistics

Most successful coaches
The following table is pre-sorted by total number of Olympic medals (in descending order), number of Olympic gold medals (in descending order), number of Olympic silver medals (in descending order), year of winning the last Olympic medal (in ascending order), year of winning the first Olympic medal (in ascending order), name of the coach (in ascending order), respectively. Last updated: 5 May 2021.

There are two coaches who led Hungary men's national water polo team to win three or more Olympic medals.

Dénes Kemény of Hungary is one of the only two coaches who led men's national water polo team(s) to win three Olympic gold medals. Under his leadership, the Hungary men's Olympic team won three gold in a row between 2000 and 2008, becoming the second water polo team to have an Olympic winning streak.

Dezső Gyarmati coached the Hungary men's national team to three consecutive Olympic medals, a silver in 1972, a gold in 1976, and a bronze in 1980.

Medals as coach and player
The following table is pre-sorted by total number of Olympic medals (in descending order), number of Olympic gold medals (in descending order), number of Olympic silver medals (in descending order), year of winning the last Olympic medal (in ascending order), year of winning the first Olympic medal (in ascending order), name of the person (in ascending order), respectively. Last updated: 5 May 2021.

Dezső Gyarmati of Hungary won five Olympic medals in a row between 1948 and 1964. He coached the Hungary men's national team to three consecutive Olympic medals, including a gold in 1976, making him the only man to win Olympic gold in water polo as player and head coach in the last 100 years.

With the Hungary men's national water polo team, István Görgényi won a silver medal at the 1972 Summer Olympics in Munich. He was appointed head coach of the Australia women's national team in 1998. At the 2000 Sydney Olympics, he led the team to win the inaugural women's water polo gold medal.

Legend
 Year* – As host team

Olympic champions

1932 Summer Olympics

1936 Summer Olympics

1952 Summer Olympics

1956 Summer Olympics

1964 Summer Olympics

1976 Summer Olympics

2000 Summer Olympics

2004 Summer Olympics

2008 Summer Olympics

Water polo people at the opening and closing ceremonies

Flag bearers

Some sportspeople were chosen to carry the national flag of their country at the opening and closing ceremonies of the Olympic Games. As of the 2020 Summer Olympics, two male water polo people were given the honour to carry the flag for Hungary.

Legend
  – Opening ceremony of the 2008 Summer Olympics
  – Closing ceremony of the 2012 Summer Olympics
 Flag bearer‡ – Flag bearer who won the tournament with his team

See also
 Hungary women's Olympic water polo team records and statistics
 List of men's Olympic water polo tournament records and statistics
 Lists of Olympic water polo records and statistics
 Hungary at the Olympics

Notes

References

Sources

ISHOF

External links
 Hungary men's national water polo team – Official website 
 Olympic water polo – Official website

.Olympics, Men
Olympic water polo team records and statistics